American singer and talk show host Kelly Clarkson has been honored with numerous accolades for her work in music and television. She came into prominence after becoming the original winner of the American television competition American Idol in 2002. Her debut studio album Thankful was released in a year later and produced the hit single "Miss Independent" which was nominated for a Grammy Award for Best Female Pop Vocal Performance and a MTV Video Music Award for Best New Artist in a Video. Her sophomore studio album Breakaway, released in 2004, won a Grammy Award for Best Pop Vocal Album and was nominated for an American Music Award and a Juno Award. Its lead single "Since U Been Gone" won a Grammy Award for Best Female Pop Vocal Performance and two MTV Video Music Awards, while its follow-up single "Because of You" also won an MTV Video Music Award and was bestowed by the American Society of Composers, Authors and Publishers for its Pop Song of the Year award.

Clarkson's third studio album My December was released in 2007. That same year, she released a duet recording of "Because of You" with American singer Reba McEntire which was nominated for various country music awards, including a Grammy Award nomination for Best Country Collaboration with Vocals. Released in 2009, her fourth studio album All I Ever Wanted merited a consideration for a Grammy Award for Best Pop Vocal Album. Its lead single "My Life Would Suck Without You" received a MTV Video Music Award nomination. Her collaboration with American recording artist Jason Aldean titled "Don't You Wanna Stay" was released in the following year and has received several country music awards and nominations, including a Grammy Award nomination for Best Country Duo/Group Performance.

Clarkson's fifth studio album Stronger was released in 2011 and won a Grammy Award for Best Pop Vocal Album in 2013, making her and Adele the only two artist recipients to win the award more than once. Its single "Stronger (What Doesn't Kill You)" also received three Grammy Award considerations, including a nomination for Record of the Year. Her two subsequent album releases Greatest Hits – Chapter One and Wrapped in Red both received World Music Award nominations. In addition, Chapter Ones single "Don't Rush", featuring American musician Vince Gill, also received a Grammy Award nomination for Best Country Duo/Group Performance. Clarkson's seventh studio album Piece by Piece was released in 2015 and was nominated for a Grammy Award for Best Pop Vocal Album—earning her the record for most nominations for an artist in the category. Two of the album's singles "Heartbeat Song" and an alternate version of "Piece by Piece" were also nominated for a Grammy Award for Best Pop Solo Performance. Her eighth studio album Meaning of Life was released in 2017 and earned her a record fifth nomination for the Grammy Award for Best Pop Vocal Album. "Love So Soft" became her fourth single to be nominated for Best Pop Solo Performance. For hosting the variety talk show The Kelly Clarkson Show, she has received five Daytime Emmy Awards for Outstanding Entertainment Talk Show Host and Outstanding Talk Show Entertainment.

Academy of Country Music Awards
Presented by the Academy of Country Music, the Academy of Country Music Awards was the first program to award achievements in the country music industry. In 2012, Clarkson won two awards for the single "Don't You Wanna Stay". She has also received three other nominations.

American Country Awards 
Broadcast by the Fox Broadcasting Company from 2010 to 2013, the American Country Awards was an annual music awards show where winners were voted by the country music audiences. Clarkson won two awards in 2011. She was subsequently nominated for two awards in 2013.

American Music Awards
Created by television entertainer Dick Clark through his production company, the American Music Awards is the world's biggest public-voted music awarding presentation, where the nominees are selected based on their commercial performance. Clarkson has won four awards from nine nominations, including the Artist of the Year award in 2005.

AOL Instant Messenger Best Musical Buddy Award
The AOL Instant Messenger Best Musical Buddy Award was given by AOL with the public voting on which musical artist they would most like on their instant messenger buddy list. Clarkson received the award in 2005.

AOL Moviegoer Awards
The AOL Moviegoer Awards were held by AOL for accomplishments in feature films as voted the film audiences across the United States. Clarkson received an award for her song "The Trouble with Love Is", from the film Love Actually in the 2003 gala.

ASCAP Music Awards 
Organized by the American Society of Composers, Authors and Publishers (ASCAP), the ASCAP Music Awards program honors the most-performed and outstanding songs written by their members. Clarkson, who became an ASCAP member in 2004, has received nine honors from the organization, including the Song of the Year award in 2007.

ASCAP Country Music Awards

ASCAP Pop Music Awards

Billboard Awards

Billboard Music Awards
The Billboard Music Awards, which celebrates chart performance achievements in the American music scene, are awarded annually by the music industry publication Billboard. Clarkson has been nominated five times.

Billboard Women in Music
The Billboard Women in Music is an annual event established by Billboard to recognize achievements and contributions of women in the music industry. Clarkson has been honored with the Powerhouse Award in 2017.

Bravo Otto
The Bravo Otto is a German accolade honoring the excellence of performers in film, television, and music. Established in 1957, the award is presented annually, with winners selected by the readers of Bravo magazine. The award is presented in gold, silver, and bronze and, since 1996, an honorary platinum statuette presented for lifetime achievement.

Brit Awards
The Brit Awards is an annual awards showcase presented by the British Phonographic Industry for successes in British popular music. Clarkson was nominated in twice in 2006.

Country Music Association Awards
Organized by the Country Music Association (CMA), the Country Music Association Awards is the longest-running annual music awards program in American TV history, honoring achievements in country music. Clarkson has received a CMA award out of six nominations.

Critics' Choice Real TV Awards
The Critics' Choice Real TV Awards are accolades for nonfiction, unscripted and reality television content presented by the Critics Choice Association and NPACT. Clarkson has been nominated once.

Critics' Choice Television Awards
The Critics' Choice Television Award is awarded by the Broadcast Television Journalists Association. Clarkson has received four nominations.

Daytime Emmy Awards
The Daytime Emmy Awards is an annual award show bestowed by the National Academy of Television Arts and Sciences in recognition of excellence in American daytime television programming. Clarkson has received five awards out of seven nominations.

Dorian Awards
The Dorian Awards are an annual awards ceremony organized by the Gay and Lesbian Entertainment Critics Association (GALECA) for the finest in film and television accessible in the United States, across a variety of categories, from general to LGBTQ-centric. Clarkson has received a nomination in 2016.

Echo Awards
The Echo Music Prize is an annual awards ceremony organized by the Deutsche Phono-Akademie (German Phonographic Academy) for achievements in the German music scene. Clarkson was nominated once in 2007.

GLAAD Media Awards
The GLAAD Media Awards is an accolade bestowed by GLAAD to recognize and honor various branches of the media for their outstanding representations of the lesbian, gay, bisexual and transgender (LGBT) community and the issues that affect their lives. Clarkson has been nominated for one award.

Gracie Awards
The Gracie Awards celebrate and honor programs created for women by women, and about women, as well as individuals who have made exemplary contributions in electronic media and affiliates. They are presented by the Alliance for Women in Media Foundation (AWM).

Grammy Awards
Promulgated as the premier honor in the American music industry, the Grammy Awards are annually presented by The Recording Academy for outstanding achievements and artistic excellence in the recording arts. Clarkson has won three Grammy Awards out of sixteen nominations. She also currently holds the record for most nominations for Best Pop Vocal Album and Best Pop Solo Performance with five and four merited considerations.

Golden Raspberry Awards
The Golden Raspberry Awards are annually presented by the Golden Raspberry Award Foundation in humorous commendation of the lamentable films of the year, as voted by affiliates whose membership were obtained from the organization's website. Clarkson has received two nominations for her performance in the film From Justin to Kelly in 2003.

Hollywood Walk of Fame
The Hollywood Walk of Fame is a historic landmark which consists of more than 2,700 five-pointed terrazzo and brass stars embedded in the sidewalks along 15 blocks of Hollywood Boulevard and three blocks of Vine Street in Hollywood, California. The stars are permanent public monuments to achievement in the entertainment industry, bearing the names of a mix of actors, directors, producers, musicians, theatrical/musical groups, fictional characters, and others. Clarkson is part of the Class of 2021 of inductees.

iHeartRadio Music Awards
Sponsored by the radio platform iHeartRadio, the iHeartRadio Music Awards are presented to American radio's most successful artists and music of the year, as determined by the station's listeners. In 2016 and 2017, Clarkson received nominations for her cover version of Barbadian artist Rihanna's singles "Bitch Better Have My Money" (2015) and "Love on the Brain" (2016).

International Dance Music Awards
Presented annually by the Winter Music Conference, the International Dance Music Awards recognize and honor exceptional achievements in the electronic dance music industry. Clarkson has received a nomination in 2006.

Juno Awards
Presented by the Canadian Academy of Recording Arts and Sciences, the Juno Awards showcase the accomplishments in the Canadian music scene every year. Clarkson received a nomination the 2006 awards event.

Los Premios 40 Principales
Los Premios 40 Principales is Spain's premier awards presentation honoring commercial successes in its music industry. Clarkson was nominated for the Best International New Artist award during its inaugural presentation in 2006.

Meteor Ireland Music Awards
Presented from 2001 to 2010, the Meteor Ireland Music Awards honors the national and international achievements in the Irish recording industry. Clarkson has received a nomination in 2006.

MuchMusic Video Awards
Produced by the Canadian channel MuchMusic, the MuchMusic Video Awards is an outdoor street awards program honoring music videos by Canadian and international artists. Clarkson has received an award in 2006.

OFM Music Awards
Produced by the South African radio station OFM, the OFM Music Awards is an awards program showcasing the most favored music in South Africa, where winners are selected by audiences in local and international categories. Clarkson has received an award in 2016.

Paramount Media Networks awards

CMT Music Awards
The CMT Music Awards are presented by Paramount Media Networks' CMT channel for recognizing country music's outstanding video and musical achievements. Clarkson was nominated for the Collaborative Video of the Year award three times.

CMT Online Awards
The CMT Online Awards were online awards organized by CMT dedicated to recognizing the year's best digital accomplishments in American country music. Clarkson has on won an award once in 2007.

Los Premios MTV Latinoamérica
Broadcast by Viacom International Media Networks – The Americas, the Los Premios MTV Latinoamérica is an annual TV special which celebrates the top artists appearing in music videos aired throughout Latin America by Paramount Global's video channels. Clarkson has received three nominations from 2005–06.

MTV Asia Awards
Aired by MTV Networks Asia from 2006–08, the MTV Asia Awards was a regional awards show recognizing the most successful Asian and international music artists. Clarkson has won an award in its 2006 program.

MTV Australia Video Music Awards
The MTV Australia Video Music Awards were awarded by MTV Networks Australia & New Zealand from 2005 to 2009 to recognize the best of Australian and international music in a variety of viewer-based categories. Clarkson has received two considerations for her music video "Because of You" in 2006.

MTV Movie & TV Awards
The MTV Movie & TV Awards is a film and television awards shows presented annually on MTV. Originally the MTV Movie Awards it was rebranded as the MTV Movie & TV Awards in 2017, to also honor work in television. Clarkson has one win out of two nominations.

MTV Video Music Awards
The MTV Video Music Awards are annually presented by Viacom's flagship channel MTV to honor outstanding music videos having an impact on the youth pop culture. Clarkson has earned three Video Music Awards from eleven nominations.

Nickelodeon Kids' Choice Awards
The Nickelodeon Kids' Choice Awards are broadcast by Nickelodeon to honor American children audiences' favorite works in film, music, TV, and others as voted by its viewers. Clarkson has received one award out of two nominations.

Nickelodeon HALO Awards
The Nickelodeon HALO Awards profiles five teens who are  Helping, And Leading Others. Each year there is a HALO Hall of Fame recipient. Clarkson was the honoree for 2017.

{| class="wikitable plainrowheaders" style="width:85%;"
|-
! width="5"|Year
! width="250"| Nominee
! width="350"| Category
! width="65"| Result
! width="5"| 
|-
!2017
|Kelly Clarkson
|HALO Hall of Fame
|
|align="center"|

TRL Awards
The TRL Awards were awarded by MTV's live television program Total Request Live (TRL) for the best performing music videos broadcast by the program, as voted by its viewers. Clarkson has received an award out of two nominations in the 2006 special.

TMF Award
Broadcast by MTV Networks Northern Europe's TMF channel in Belgium from 1999 to 2009, the TMF Awards awards achievements in the music scene of the Dutch-speaking regions to local and international artists. Clarkson received three awards.

People's Choice Awards
The People's Choice Awards is an annual awards program recognizing popular culture successes in the entertainment industry, where winners are chosen based on general public polling. Clarkson has won two awards out of five nominations.

Pollstar Awards
The Pollstar Awards are awarded by the trade publication Pollstar to artists, management, talent buyers, venues, and support services for professionalism and achievements in the concert tour industry. Clarkson has received a nomination in 2009.

Premios Oye!
The Premios Nacional a la Música Grabada, popularly known as the Premios Oye!, are awarded by the Academia Nacional de la Música en México (National Academy of Music in Mexico) for excellence in the Mexican music industry. Clarkson was nominated once in the 2006 ceremony.

Queerty Awards

!Ref.
|-
| 2013
| "People Like Us"
| Anthem of the Year
| 
|

Radio Disney Music Awards
Organized by the American radio network Radio Disney, the Radio Disney Music Awards awards the year's achievements in the teen pop music industry, as determined by the network's adolescent audiences. Clarkson had won three awards from fourteen nominations, including the Icon Award at the 2018 ceremony.

Radio Music Awards
Presented from 1999 to 2005, the Radio Music Awards was an annual music awards gala lauding the outstanding commercial performances on American radio airplay, as monitored by music industry research firm Mediabase. Clarkson received one an award out of six nominations.

The Record of the Year
The Record of the Year was an award special televised by the ITV network where the winner is voted by the British audiences from a selection of the year's ten biggest-selling singles in the United Kingdom. Clarkson's song "Since U Been Gone" was shortlisted for 2005 prize.

Teen Choice Awards
The Teen Choice Awards, organized by the Fox Broadcasting Company, is an annual TV special awarding the most influential in the cultural zeitgeist of adolescent audiences. Clarkson has won six awards out of twenty-one nominations, including a clean sweep in the 2005 program.

XM Nation Music Awards
Presented by XM Satellite Radio in 2005, the XM Nation Music Awards honor the year's most successful artists and songs on satellite radio airplay. Clarkson has won two awards from the 2005 awarding presentation.

Women's World Awards
Presented by World Awards organization president Mikhail Gorbachev, the Women's World Awards are awarded to exemplary women whose achievements contribute to furthering self-determination, gender equality, freedom and the elimination of all forms of social and economic discrimination. Queen Noor of Jordan personally bestowed Clarkson with the World Entertainment Award for facilitating in popularizing a new entertainment genre that has become a worldwide success in 2009.

World Music Awards 
The World Music Awards honor the world's best-selling artists and recordings as determined by worldwide sales figures provided by the International Federation of the Phonographic Industry. Clarkson has accumulated a total of eleven nominations.

References

External links 
 

Awards
Lists of awards received by American musician